Ak Astana-Baba is a 10th-11th century mausoleum that is located in the Sariosiyo District, Surxondaryo Region of Uzbekistan. The mausoleum was submitted to the UNESCO World Heritage Tentative List on June 1, 1996, in the Cultural category.

References 

Mausoleums in Uzbekistan
World Heritage Sites in Uzbekistan
World Heritage Tentative List